This is a list of notable triplets. One in about 8,100 natural pregnancies results in triplets.

The mythological Irish Findemna, Bres, Nár, and Lothar, sometimes interpreted as triplets. Seduced by their sister Clothar when it was feared they would die without children.
Tenskwatawa (1771-1836), Shawnee prophet and brother of Tecumseh, was one of a set of triplets.
The Kirchner triplets, Catherine, Marguerite, and Frances (born 23 August 1920 in Brooklyn, NY), believed to be the oldest identical living triplets in the United States.
The Del Rubio triplets, Edith (B. Boyd), Elena (Boyd), and Milly (Boyd) (born 23 August 1921 in Panama), variety/musical act of the 1980s who rose to notoriety due mostly to their campy style of dress and their goofy interpretations of standards and songs of the era.
Elisabeth Kübler-Ross (born July 8, 1926 in Zürich, Switzerland, died 24 August 2004 in Scottsdale, Arizona), psychiatrist and author perhaps best known for developing the "Five Stages of Grief", was one of a set of identical triplets.
Carol Ann Toupes (January 31, 1936 – July 24, 2004) was one of the Toupes triplets whose birth and early childhood captivated the San Francisco media of the day.
Chris Dickerson (August 25, 1939 – December 23, 2021) was an American professional bodybuilder, winning the Mr America and Mr Olympia titles.  He was the youngest of triplets born to lawyer and advocate Mahala Ashley Dickerson.
The Kosanovic triplets, identical males (born November 28, 1948 in Meadville, Pennsylvania), believed to be the oldest set of identical triplets in Oregon. Joe lives in Eagle Crest, Gerry lives in Corvallis, and Jim lives in Portland.
María Laura, María Emilia, and María Eugenia Fernández Roussee (born July 5, 1960 in Argentina), identical triplets who worked as singers, actresses, and presenters in Argentinian radio, television, and cinema films, mainly in the 1970s and 1980s. They were known as Las Trillizas de Oro ("The Golden Triplets") in Spanish, and as Trix in Italy.
Robert Shafran, David Kellman, and Eddy Galland (born July 12, 1961) were separated at birth in an adoption/twins study. Reunited in 1980 by coincidence, they were the subject of media attention at the time. They are mentioned in the 2007 memoir Identical Strangers, and their lives are the subject of the 2018 documentary Three Identical Strangers by film-maker Tim Wardle.
The Levesque Triplets are identical triplet models  who have walked together in various shows during New York Fashion Week and have appeared on multiple TV segments such as Good Morning America, E! Live from the Red Carpet to the Oscars, and Dr. Oz.
Diana, Sylvia, and Vicky Villegas (born April 18, 1965) became famous briefly in the 1980s and 1990s as US/Latin pop group The Triplets. They had a hit with the song "You Don't Have To Go Home Tonight" in 1991.
The Creel triplets, Leanna, Monica, and Joy (born August 27, 1970 in Los Angeles, California), starred in Parent Trap III and Parent Trap: Hawaiian Honeymoon, two Disney made-for-TV movies.
The Haden triplets, Petra, Tanya, and Rachel (born October 11, 1971 in New York City), musicians who have performed individually in bands and together. They are the daughters of jazz double-bassist Charlie Haden.
Nicole, Erica and Jaclyn Dahm (born December 22, 1977 in Minneapolis, Minnesota), identical triplets who were featured as Playmates in the December 1998 issue of Playboy magazine.
The Karshner triplets of Lake Isabella, California, Craig, Nick, and Ryan (born December 23, 1982), models who have been featured in advertisements for Abercrombie & Fitch and Cingular.
Bob, Clint, and Dave Moffatt (born March 30, 1984 in Tumbler Ridge, British Columbia), part of the Canadian family musical band The Moffatts. Bob and Clint are identical, while Dave is fraternal.
Leila, Liina, and Lily Luik (born 14 October 1985), identical triplets from Estonia. They all competed in marathon at the 2016 Summer Olympics in Rio de Janeiro, becoming first set of triplets to have competed in the Olympics.
The Armstrong triplets of Truro, Cornwall, United Kingdom, Lil, Helen, and Kate (born c. 1986), first triplets to have all been accepted into Cambridge University.
The British boy band The Noise Next Door, is made up of triplets Craig, Scott and Ed Sutton (born May 30, 1986).
Eino Puri, Sander Puri, and Kadri Puri (born May 7, 1988); Eino and Sander are footballers, Kadri is a volleyball player.
Taylor Red, country music singers and identical triplet sisters Nicole Taylor, Natalie Taylor and Nika Taylor born March 18, 1991.
Scottish Footballer Kyle Jacobs (born June 14, 1991) is a triplet alongside Devon and Sheldon.
Leo, Gerry and Myles Fitzgerald (born August 26, 1993), played Sly and Whit in the 1999 film Baby Geniuses and also appeared as Kahuna in the sequel, Superbabies: Baby Geniuses 2 in 2004.
Asad, Saqib and Sikander Zulfiqar (born March 28, 1997) are triplets who have each played  international cricket for the Netherlands. Their father Zulfiqar Ahmed did likewise.
Anna-Maria Alexandri, Eirini-Marina Alexandri, and Vasiliki Alexandri (born September 15, 1997) were born in Greece and compete as Austrians in synchronised swimming.

See also
List of twins

References

External links
 Facts About Multiples: An Encyclopedia of Multiple Births.
 Weplee.com: multiples and their parents community
 Tamba, Twins and Multiple Births Association

Lists of families
Triplets